The Malaysian Bar (Malay: Badan Peguam Malaysia) is a professional body which regulates the profession of lawyers in peninsular Malaysia. In Malaysia, there is no distinction between a barrister and a solicitor, in that, it is a fused profession. Membership into the Bar is automatic and mandatory. The bar was created under the Legal Profession Act 1976. Like other bar associations around the world, it has a wide range of functions, including, to protect the reputation of the legal profession, to uphold the cause of justice, to express its views on matters relating to legislations, and others.

The management of the affairs of the Bar is undertaken by a council known as the Bar Council (Malay: Majlis Peguam). The Bar Council comprises thirty eight members who are elected annually to manage the affairs and execute the functions of the Malaysian Bar. The Council consists of the immediate past President and Vice-President of the Malaysian Bar, the Chairman of each of the twelve State Bar Committees, one member elected by each of the twelve State Bar Committees to be its representative to the Bar Council, and twelve members elected from throughout Peninsular Malaysia by way of postal ballot.

Separate bodies regulate the legal profession in the states of Sabah and Sarawak. Their bar associations are known as the Sabah Law Society and the Advocates' Association of Sarawak respectively.

The Council is headed by a President. As of 2019, the President of the Council is Salim Bashir.

History of the Malaysian Bar
A semblance of the present day Bar Council was established vide Advocates & Solicitors Enactment 1914 (FMS No. 22/1914) covering the legal practitioners in the Federated Malay States. The first annual meeting of the Federated Malay States Bar was held at Kuala Lumpur, representatives of the profession being present from Selangor and Perak. The following Federal Bar Committee was elected, Messrs. A. N Kenion, Byrant, H.A. Hope, T. H. I. Rogers and A. P Robinson.

The 1914 Enactment was replaced by the Advocates & Solicitors Ordinance 1940. The Unfederated Malay States like Johore had their own Enactments like the Advocates & Solicitors Enactment of Johore. The Solicitors in the Straits Settlements of Malacca and Penang together with Singapore were covered by the Advocates & Solicitors Ordinance of the Straits Settlements.

After the Japanese Occupation, the Advocates & Solicitors Ordinance 1947 replaced all the statutes covering the Unfederated and Federated Malay States and the Straits Settlements of Malacca and Penang. The 1947 Ordinance can be referred to as the starting point that established the 1st Bar Council covering Malaya. It was the 1st time a self-elected and self-regulated Bar Council was established. But its role was somewhat limited to:

 representing the Bar in matters affecting the legal profession as a whole
 make rules regarding practice and etiquette of the profession
 examine and report on current legislation
 deal with admission and entry requirements into the profession
 oversee standards and discipline among members of the Bar

But the Legal Profession Act 1976 which replaced the 1947 Ordinance provided for a truly independent Bar. The Bar Council represents the Malaysian Bar at:

 the Qualifying Board which decides on the qualification for entry into the profession.
 the Disciplinary Board – all Advocates & Solicitors are subject to the control of this Board in all matters relating to discipline.
 the Solicitors Costs Committee which makes general orders regulating the remuneration of Advocates & Solicitors in respect of non-contentious business.
 the Rules Committee which is empowered to make rules regulating the procedures in court.

Singapore lawyers could freely practice in West Malaysia until its doors were closed on 31 December 1970.

Admission to the Malaysian Bar

All matters pertaining to the qualifications and requirements for admission to the Bar in Malaysia are governed by the provisions under the Legal Profession Act 1976 (the Act). To be eligible for admission, a candidate must satisfy all requirements as are provided in the Act which may be broadly categorised as follows:

 academic requirements
 practical requirements
 formal requirements

As to the academic requirements, this is satisfied if a candidate can show that he/she is a 'qualified person' within the meaning of section 3 of the Act. Under the Act, 'qualified person' means any person who:

 has passed the final examination leading to the degree of Bachelor of Laws of the University of Malaya, the University of Malaya in Singapore, the University of Singapore or the National University of Singapore;
 is a barrister-at-law of England; or
 in possession of such other qualification as may by notification in the Gazette be declared by the Board to be sufficient to make a person a qualified person for the purposes of the Act.

Such person must then satisfy the practical and formal requirements before he/she may petition for admission. A pupil intending to commence his pupillage must file various documents with the High Court to qualify as an Advocate and Solicitor in Malaysia.

List of presidents of the Malaysian Bar

Malayan Bar (1947–1963)
1947–1952: E. D. Shearn
1953–1960: R. Ramani
1960–1961: Morris Edgar
1961–1963: R. Ramani

Malaysian Bar
1963–1964: S. M. Yong
1964–1973: R. R. Chelliah
1973–1974: Chan Hua Eng
1974–1976: V. C. George
1976–1978: Raja Aziz Addruse
1978–1980: Abdullah A. Rahman
1980–1982: G. T. S. Sidhu
1982–1984: S. Sivasubaramaniam
1984–1986: Dato' Ronald Khoo Teng Swee
1986–1988: Param Cumaraswamy
1988–1989: Raja Aziz Addruse
1989–1991: S. Theivanthiran
1991–1992: Manjeet Singh Dhillon
1992–1993: Raja Aziz Addruse
1993–1995: Zainur Zakaria
1995–1997: Hendon Haji Abdullah
1997–1999: Dato' Dr Cyrus V. Das
1999–2000: Barrister Amirul Zaid
2000–2001: Haji Sulaiman Abdullah
2001–2003: Mah Weng Kwai
2003–2005: Kuthubul Zaman Bukhari
2005–2007: Yeo Yang Poh
2007–2009: Ambiga Sreenevasan
2009–2011: Ragunath Kesavan
2011–2013: Lim Chee Wee
2013–2015: Christopher Leong Sau Foo
2015-2017: Steven Thiru
2017-2019: George Varughese
2019-2020: Dato'Abdul Fareed Abdul Gafoor
2020-2021: Salim Bashir
2021-2022: A.G Kalidas
2022-2023: Karen Cheah Yee Lynn

See also
Certificate in Legal Practice (Malaysia)
Kuala Lumpur Bar
List of Malayan Law Firms

References

External links
The Malaysian Bar Official Website

M
B

1947 establishments in Malaya
Organizations established in 1947